Mark Andrew Walton (born 1 June 1969) is a Welsh former professional footballer. He was a goalkeeper who played for Luton Town, Colchester United, Norwich City, Wrexham, Dundee United, Bolton Wanderers, Fulham, Gillingham and Brighton.

After leaving Bolton Wanderers in 1994 he spent two years playing for various non-league sides before signing for Fulham. He left Brighton in 2000 to sign for Cardiff City on a free transfer where he spent three years. While with Norwich, Walton played the FA Cup semi-final against Sunderland in 1992.

Walton moved to Australia in 2004 to play for Bentleigh Greens.

Honours
With Cardiff City
FAW Premier Cup winner: 1
 2001–02

References

External links
Career information at ex-canaries.co.uk

1969 births
Living people
Welsh footballers
Wales under-21 international footballers
Luton Town F.C. players
Colchester United F.C. players
Norwich City F.C. players
Wrexham A.F.C. players
Dundee United F.C. players
Bolton Wanderers F.C. players
Merthyr Tydfil F.C. players
Fakenham Town F.C. players
Fulham F.C. players
Gillingham F.C. players
Brighton & Hove Albion F.C. players
Cardiff City F.C. players
English Football League players
Association football goalkeepers
Wroxham F.C. players